The following is the 1998–99 network television schedule for the six major English language commercial broadcast networks in the United States. The schedule covers primetime hours from September 1998 through August 1999. The schedule is followed by a list per network of returning series, new series, and series cancelled after the 1997–98 season. All times are Eastern and Pacific, with certain exceptions, such as Monday Night Football.

New series highlighted in bold.

Each of the 30 highest-rated shows is listed with its rank and rating as determined by Nielsen Media Research.

 Yellow indicates the programs in the top 10 for the season.
 Cyan indicates the programs in the top 20 for the season.
 Magenta indicates the programs in the top 30 for the season.
Other Legend
 Light blue indicates local programming.
 Gray indicates encore programming.
 Blue-gray indicates news programming.
 Light green indicates sporting events.
 Light Purple indicates movies. 
 Red indicates series being burned off and other regularly scheduled programs, including specials.

PBS, the Public Broadcasting Service, is not included; member stations have local flexibility over most of their schedules and broadcast times for network shows may vary.

Sunday

Monday 

Note: UPN only broadcast the first two episodes of Power Play. On August 16, 1999, ABC aired the series episode of Who Wants to Be a Millionaire at 8:30pm EST. It was the only 30 minute episode to air on a Monday night.

Tuesday 

NOTE: On Fox, Brimstone was supposed to premiere 9-10, but it was moved up to Friday.

Wednesday

Thursday 

Note: On Fox, Hollyweird was supposed to premiere 9:00-10:00 but it was canceled due to a conflict with Shaun Cassidy.

Friday 

Note: On Fox, the one-hour drama Brimstone premiered at 8:00 on October 23, 1998.

Saturday

By network

ABC

Returning series
20/20
America's Funniest Home Videos
Boy Meets World
Dharma & Greg
The Drew Carey Show
Home Improvement
Monday Night Football
NYPD Blue
The Practice
Sabrina the Teenage Witch
Spin City
Two Guys, a Girl and a Pizza Place
The Wonderful World of Disney

New series
The Big Moment *
Brother's Keeper
Cupid
Fantasy Island
The Hughleys
It's Like, You Know... *
The Norm Show *
The Secret Lives of Men
Sports Night
Strange World *
Two of a Kind
Vengeance Unlimited
Whose Line Is It Anyway?

Not returning from 1997–98:
ABC News Saturday Night
The ABC Sunday Night Movie
C-16: FBI
Cracker
Ellen
Grace Under Fire
Hiller and Diller
Maximum Bob
Nothing Sacred
Over the Top
Prey
Primetime Live
Push
Soul Man
Something So Right
Teen Angel
That's Life
Timecop
Total Security
You Wish

CBS

Returning series
48 Hours
60 Minutes
Candid Camera
CBS Sunday Movie
Chicago Hope
Cosby
Diagnosis: Murder
Early Edition
Everybody Loves Raymond
JAG
Kids Say the Darndest Things
The Magnificent Seven
The Nanny
Nash Bridges
Promised Land
Touched by an Angel
Unsolved Mysteries
Walker, Texas Ranger

New series
60 Minutes II
Becker *
The Brian Benben Show
Buddy Faro
The King of Queens
L.A. Doctors
Maggie Winters
Martial Law
Payne *
Sons of Thunder *
Thanks *
To Have & to Hold
Turks *

Not returning from 1997–98:
Brooklyn South
The Closer
Cybill
Dellaventura
Dr. Quinn, Medicine Woman
Family Matters
Four Corners
George and Leo
The Gregory Hines Show
Meego
Michael Hayes
Murphy Brown (revived in 2018–19)
Public Eye with Bryant Gumbel
The Simple Life
Step by Step
Style & Substance

Fox

Returning series
Ally McBeal
America's Most Wanted
Beverly Hills, 90210
COPS
Fox Files
FOX Night at the Movies
Guinness World Records Primetime
Getting Personal
King of the Hill
Melrose Place
Millennium
Party of Five
The Simpsons
The World's Funniest!
World's Wildest Police Videos
The X-Files

New series
Brimstone
Costello
Family Guy *
Futurama *
Holding the Baby *
Living in Captivity
The PJs *
That '70s Show

Not returning from 1997–98:
413 Hope St.
Ask Harriet
Between Brothers (moved to UPN)
Damon
Living Single
New York Undercover
Significant Others
The Visitor

NBC

Returning series
3rd Rock from the Sun
Caroline in the City
Dateline NBC
ER
Frasier
Friends
Homicide: Life on the Street
Just Shoot Me!
LateLine
Law & Order
Mad About You
NBC Sunday Night Movie
The NBC Monday Movie
NewsRadio
The Pretender
Profiler
Suddenly Susan
Veronica's Closet
Working

New series
Conrad Bloom
Encore! Encore!
Everything's Relative *
Jesse
Providence *
Trinity
Will & Grace
Wind on Water
World's Most Amazing Videos *

Not returning from 1997–98:
Built to Last
Fired Up
For Your Love (moved to The WB)
House Rules
Jenny
Men Behaving Badly
The Naked Truth
Players
Seinfeld
Sleepwalkers
Stressed Eric
The Tony Danza Show
Union Square

UPN

Returning series
Between Brothers (moved from Fox)
Clueless
Love Boat: The Next Wave
Malcolm & Eddie
Moesha
The Sentinel
Star Trek: Voyager

New series
America's Greatest Pets *
Dilbert *
DiResta
Family Rules *
Guys Like Us
Home Movies *
Legacy
Mercy Point
Power Play (originally aired on CTV)
Redhanded *
Reunited *
The Secret Diary of Desmond Pfeiffer
Seven Days
UPN's Night at the Movies

Not returning from 1997–98:
Good News
Head Over Heels
Hitz
In the House
Sparks

The WB
Returning series

7th Heaven
Buffy the Vampire Slayer
Dawson's Creek
For Your Love (moved from NBC)
The Jamie Foxx Show
The Parent 'Hood
Sister, Sister
Smart Guy
The Steve Harvey Show
Unhappily Ever After
The Wayans Bros.

New series
The Army Show
Charmed
Felicity
Hyperion Bay
Katie Joplin *
Movie Stars *
Rescue 77 *
Zoe, Duncan, Jack and Jane *

Not returning from 1997–98:
Alright Already
Invasion America
Kelly Kelly
Nick Freno: Licensed Teacher
Three
The Tom Show
You're the One

Note: The * indicates that the program was introduced in midseason.

References

United States primetime network television schedules
United States Network Television Schedule, 1998-99
United States Network Television Schedule, 1998-99